Town is a ward in the Borough of Newcastle-under-Lyme, in the county of Staffordshire, England. It covers the town centre of Newcastle-under-Lyme. In 2021 it had a population of 5604.

References 

Wards of the Borough of Newcastle-under-Lyme
Newcastle-under-Lyme